Bare is a village in the municipality of Rekovac, Serbia. According to the 2002 census, the village has a population of 77 people.

A Bronze Age grave of a prominent man with rich jewelry of gold was unveiled under a mound in the village.

References

External links 

Levac Online
Pictures.

Populated places in Pomoravlje District